Marco Estrada may refer to:
Marco Estrada (footballer)
Marco Estrada (baseball)